Rocca di Neto is a town and comune of the province of Crotone in the Calabria region of southern Italy. It is crossed by the Neto river from which it takes its current name; until 1863 it was known as Rocca Ferdinandea in honour of king Ferdinand I of Two Sicilies.

References

Cities and towns in Calabria